Rains is an unincorporated community in Marion County, South Carolina, United States. Along the CSX Seaboard Air Line, the area is a predominantly farming community and quarry station.

It was first listed as a CDP in the 2020 census with a population of 242.

Demographics

2020 census

Note: the US Census treats Hispanic/Latino as an ethnic category. This table excludes Latinos from the racial categories and assigns them to a separate category. Hispanics/Latinos can be of any race.

References

Unincorporated communities in Marion County, South Carolina
Unincorporated communities in South Carolina